The Donets ruffe (Gymnocephalus acerina) is a species of perch native to eastern Europe where it occurs in the basins of the Black Sea and the Sea of Azov.  They inhabit freshwater lakes and rivers usually over hard compacted sand.  They are predominantly crepuscular and prey mostly on invertebrates (crustaceans, insect larvae, mollusks), rarely on fish.  They are inactive during winter months, and usually move to deeper places until the ice melts. Spawning occurs in small rivers with heavy currents.  This species reaches a length of  SL.

References

Gymnocephalus
Freshwater fish of Europe
Fish of Russia
Fauna of Ukraine
Donets basin
Don basin
Fish of the Black Sea
Fish of the Sea of Azov
Fish described in 1789
Taxa named by Johann Friedrich Gmelin
Taxonomy articles created by Polbot